The R759 road is a regional road in Ireland running south-east to north-west through the Sally Gap in the Wicklow Mountains, from the R755 near Roundwood in East Wicklow to the N81 in West Wicklow.  The other route through the Wicklow Mountains from east to west is the Wicklow Gap which is crossed by the R756.

The highest point on the road is at the Sally Gap where it crosses the Military Road (R115), 503m (1,650 ft). The road passes through some spectacular scenery, including the corrie lake of Lough Tay below Luggala mountain, in the Guinness Estate; the road gives access to several woodlands car-parks at Lough Tay, which are used to access the mountains around Djouce. The moorlands of the Sally Gap plateau, the Liffey Head Bog on the slopes of Tonduff, form the source of the River Liffey.

Gallery

See also

Roads in Ireland
National primary road
National secondary road
Rathfarnham and the Military Road
Ireland's first ski rescue

References
Roads Act 1993 (Classification of Regional Roads) Order 2006 – Department of Transport

Regional roads in the Republic of Ireland
Roads in County Wicklow
Mountain passes of Ireland